The England national cricket team toured the West Indies from January to April 1990 and played a five-match Test series against the West Indies cricket team which the West Indies won 2–1. The Second Test, scheduled as England’s first at Bourda since 1973–74 due to the Guyanese government’s refusal to admit Robin Jackman in 1980–81 and to admit anyone who had played or coached in apartheid South Africa in 1985–86, was abandoned without a ball being bowled. In addition, the teams played a five-match Limited Overs International (LOI) series which the West Indies won 3–0. The West Indies were captained by Viv Richards, and England by Graham Gooch; following an injury in the Third Test, Allan Lamb replaced Gooch as captain.

Test match summary

First Test

Second Test

Third Test

Fourth Test

Fifth Test

ODI series summary

West Indies won the Cable and Wireless Series 3–0, with two no results.

1st ODI

2nd ODI

3rd ODI

4th ODI

5th ODI

Georgetown Test Match replacement ODIs

When the Georgetown Test was washed out, two replacement One-Day Internationals were arranged for the scheduled fourth and fifth days of the match; the first of these was itself washed out. These did not count towards the Cable and Wireless ODI Series.

1st ODI

2nd ODI

References

1990 in English cricket
1990 in West Indian cricket
1989-90
International cricket competitions from 1988–89 to 1991
West Indian cricket seasons from 1970–71 to 1999–2000